Frank Mendicino is an American politician. He served as a Democratic member of the Wyoming House of Representatives.

Life and career 
Mendicino attended the University of Colorado.

In 1973, Mendicino was elected to the Wyoming House of Representatives, representing Albany County, Wyoming, serving until 1974. In 1975, he served as Wyoming Attorney General, succeeding David B. Kennedy. He served until 1978, when he was succeeded by John J. Rooney.

References 

Living people
Place of birth missing (living people)
Year of birth missing (living people)
Democratic Party members of the Wyoming House of Representatives
20th-century American politicians
Wyoming Attorneys General
University of Colorado alumni